HMS Sheffield was one of the Southampton sub class of the  cruisers of the Royal Navy during the Second World War. She took part in actions against several major German warships. Unlike most Royal Navy ships of her time, her fittings were constructed from stainless steel instead of the more traditional brass. This was an attempt to reduce the amount of cleaning required on the part of the crew. Her nickname, the "Shiny Sheff", stemmed from this. A prototype radar system was placed into service in August 1938 on the Sheffield. It was the first vessel in the Royal Navy to be so equipped.

Building
Vickers-Armstrongs built Sheffield at High Walker, Newcastle upon Tyne. Her keel was laid on 31 January 1935, she was launched on 23 July 1936 and she was completed on 25 August 1937.

War service

At the outbreak of war, Sheffield served with the 18th Cruiser Squadron, patrolling the Denmark Straits and then, in April 1940, she was engaged in the Norwegian Campaign. After a short spell carrying out anti-invasion duties in the English Channel, she joined Force H, based in Gibraltar. During that time, she operated in the Mediterranean and the Atlantic until the year's end, and took part in Operation White and the battle of Cape Spartivento.

In 1941, she participated in Operation Grog, the shelling of Genoa, in  operations against Vichy convoys and supporting air reinforcements to Malta. (In the report of the attack, Admiral Sir John Tovey, commanding Home Fleet, was told only no hits were scored on Bismarck. The reaction of Sheffields crew "has not made its way into the official records".) On 12 June, she located and sank one of Bismarcks tankers, Friedrich Breme. After the destruction in early October 1941 of another German supply ship, Kota Penang, (aided by the cruiser ), Sheffield returned to Britain.

She was occupied on Arctic convoys until hitting a mine off Iceland on 3 March 1942 and was under repair until July. After more Arctic convoys, Sheffield joined the forces supporting the Allied landings in North Africa (Operation Torch) in November. In December 1942, Sheffield and Jamaica formed "Force R", under the command of Rear-Admiral Robert Burnett (in Sheffield), which provided cover for Convoy JW 51B. The convoy was attacked by a strong German surface force. In the ensuing action (Battle of the Barents Sea), the Germans withdrew and Sheffield sank the German destroyer , while also damaging the cruiser , Eckoldt mistaking Sheffield for Hipper. During this engagement, the destroyer  and the minesweeper  were sunk by gunfire of the two German vessels.

In February 1943, Sheffield moved to operate in the Bay of Biscay and, in July and August, she supported the landings at Salerno (Operation Avalanche). Returning yet again to the Arctic, she took part in the sinking of the battleship Scharnhorst off the north coast of Norway, in late December.

These had limited success and responsibility was passed to the Royal Air Force.

A lengthy refit in Boston and in Britain kept Sheffield out of action until after the end of the war.

Post-war

The refit was completed in May 1946 and Sheffield alternated between duties in the America and West Indies Station (where in 1954 she served as flagship of the 8th Cruiser Squadron), based at the Royal Naval Dockyard in the Imperial fortress colony of Bermuda, and in home waters and the Mediterranean. From June 1952 to May 1953, her commanding officer was Capt. John Inglis, who was to become director of Naval Intelligence in July 1954. In 1953 she took part in the Fleet Review to celebrate the Coronation of Queen Elizabeth II.

There were further refits in 1949/50,1954 and 1956-7 when her bridge was enclosed, a lattice foremast added, and a comprehensive anti nuclear and biological washdown installed in 1959–60.  Her final light anti-aircraft outfit consisted of 8 twin Bofors Mk 5 and 2 single Bofors Mk 7. In 1955, she played the part of the cruiser  in the war film The Battle of the River Plate. She went into reserve in January 1959, but as the refit of HMS Swiftsure was stopped due to structure weakness, and the Town cruisers, was considered far more comfortable and able to carry far more light AA, HMS Sheffield was the final World War II cruiser to be refitted for possible use as a GFS monitor, and became flagship of the Reserve Fleet and served again at sea in 1960 and then as an accommodation ship until September 1964, when she was placed on the disposal list. She was widely considered as a historic and great  British warship, justifying preservation and a cruiser which maintained far more the character and fit of a World War II cruiser compared with the more modified Belfast. However, by 1966, examination showed Sheffield had deteriorated too much in unmaintained reserve in Fareham Creek and could not be preserved.

Her equipment was removed at Rosyth in 1967 and she was then broken up at Faslane in the same year. The stainless steel ship's bell, which was made by Hadfield's of Sheffield, was preserved and today hangs in Sheffield Cathedral along with her battle ensign.

Citations

References

External links

 HMS Sheffield Association Official Website at the Wayback Machine
 Sources for the study of HMS Sheffield Produced by Sheffield City Council's Libraries and Archives

 

Town-class cruisers (1936)
1936 ships
World War II cruisers of the United Kingdom
Ships built on the River Tyne
Ships built by Vickers Armstrong